Begin A Game is a 2018 South Korean game program in which its guests will play games and share stories of past memories relating to said game. It airs every Friday night at 12:55 KST.

Host 

 Kim Jun-hyun
 Kim Hee-chul (Super Junior)
 Shindong (Super Junior)
 Guillaume Patry
 Gongchan (B1A4)
 Johyun (Berry Good)

List of episodes and ratings
In the table below, the blue numbers represent the lowest ratings and the red numbers represent the highest ratings.

References

2018 South Korean television series debuts
Korean-language television shows
2018 South Korean television series endings